The Wisconsin–River Falls Falcons football program is the intercollegiate American football team for the University of Wisconsin–River Falls located River Falls, Wisconsin. The team competes at the NCAA Division III level and is a member of the Wisconsin Intercollegiate Athletic Conference (WIAC).  The school first fielded a football team in 1895. The Falcons wear red, white, and black. Ramer Field, where the Falcon's play their home games, was the host of the Kansas City Chiefs' training camp from 1992 to 2008.

History

Mike Farley (1970–1988)
The Falcons were most successful under coach Mike Farley (1970–1988), as he led the Falcons to a 117–71–3 record, with eight conference championships. In 1979 Farley coached the falcons to the NAIA National playoffs, the first time a Falcon football team had ever competed at the national level. Farley was named the WIAC Coach of the Year after the 1986 season. In 1979 and 1986 he was named the American Football Coaches Association Region 6 Coach of the Year, and the NAIA District 14 Coach of the Year in 1975, 1979 and 1985. He coached 91 players to All-WIAC honors, with three Falcons earning WIAC Player of the Year. Farley was inducted into the UWRF Athletic Hall of Fame in 1989, the Wisconsin Football Coaches Hall of Fame in 1994, and the Wisconsin Intercollegiate Athletic Conference (WIAC) Hall of Fame on August 4, 2012.

John O'Grady (1989–2010)
John O'Grady is the longest tenured UWRF coach with 22 seasons. He was a linebacker for the Falcons from 1972 to 1975. He previously coached at Kent State University, the University of Wisconsin–Madison, and Miami University. O'Grady won the conference championship in 1998 and advanced to the NCAA Playoffs twice (1995 and 1996). He had a career record of 105–112–3. O'Grady was named the 1995 WIAC Coach of the Year and was inducted into the Wisconsin Football Coaches Association (WFCA) Hall of Fame on April 5,in 2008.

In 2009 the Falcons finished the season at 3–7 (1–6 in WIAC). In 2010, the Falcons finished the season at 1–9 (1–6 in WIAC).

Matt Walker (2011–present)
Matt Walker was previously the head football coach at DePauw University (2006–09) where he compiled a 22–8 overall record. His teams finished 13–7 in the Southern Collegiate Athletic Conference and placed second in the final conference standings in 2007 and 2008. From 2000 to 05 Walker was an assistant coach with DePauw and coached running backs and wide receivers. In 2010, he was an assistant coach at Butler University. Walker was a two-sport athlete (baseball and football) at DePauw (1999). In 2011, the Falcons finished the season at 1–9 (1–6 in WIAC). In 2012, they finished the season 2–8 (2–4 in WIAC) and finished in sixth place.

Head coaching history

Facilities
From 1991 to 2007 UWRF was host to the Kansas City Chiefs organization. In 2006 the Chiefs won the UWRF outstanding service award for their ties to the community and dedication and respect to the university.

References

External links
 

 
American football teams established in 1895
1895 establishments in Wisconsin